In set theory, a branch of mathematical logic, Martin's maximum, introduced by  and named after Donald Martin, is a generalization of the proper forcing axiom, itself a generalization of Martin's axiom.  It represents the broadest class of forcings for which a forcing axiom is consistent.

Martin's maximum (MM) states that if D is a collection of  dense subsets of a notion of forcing that preserves stationary subsets of ω1, then there is a D-generic filter. Forcing with a ccc notion of forcing preserves stationary subsets of ω1, thus MM extends . If (P,≤) is not a stationary set preserving notion of forcing, i.e., there is a stationary subset of ω1, which becomes nonstationary when forcing with (P,≤), then there is a collection D of  dense subsets of (P,≤), such that there is no D-generic filter. This is why MM is called the maximal extension of Martin's axiom.

The existence of a supercompact cardinal implies the consistency of Martin's maximum. The proof uses Shelah's theories of semiproper forcing and iteration with revised countable supports.

It further implies stationary reflection, i.e., if S is a stationary subset of some regular cardinal κ ≥ ω2 and every element of S has countable cofinality, then there is an ordinal α < κ such that S ∩ α is stationary in α. In fact, S contains a closed subset of order type ω1.

Notes

References
 correction

See also
 Transfinite number

Forcing (mathematics)